The 2021–22 Penn Quakers men's basketball team represented the University of Pennsylvania in the 2021–22 NCAA Division I men's basketball season. The Quakers, led by sixth-year head coach Steve Donahue, played their home games at The Palestra in Philadelphia, Pennsylvania as members of the Ivy League.

Previous season
Due to the COVID-19 pandemic, the Ivy League chose not to conduct a season in 2020–21.

Roster

Schedule and results

|-
!colspan=12 style=| Exhibition

|-
!colspan=12 style=| Regular season

|-
!colspan=12 style=| Ivy League tournament

Source

References

Penn Quakers men's basketball seasons
Penn Quakers
Penn Quakers men's basketball
Penn Quakers men's basketball